Maartje Keuning is a Dutch water polo player. She competed in the 2020 Summer Olympics.

References

1998 births
Living people
Dutch female water polo players
Water polo players at the 2020 Summer Olympics
Olympic water polo players of the Netherlands
21st-century Dutch women